Fritz Fleischer (born 2 March 1894, date of death unknown) was an Austrian sprinter. He competed in the men's 100 metres at the 1912 Summer Olympics.

References

1894 births
Year of death missing
Athletes (track and field) at the 1912 Summer Olympics
Austrian male sprinters
Olympic athletes of Austria
Athletes from Vienna